is a Japanese manga artist. He won the 1989 Shogakukan Manga Award for shōnen for B.B. The manga artist Yoshitomo Yoshimoto is his younger brother.

Works 
 
 
 
 
 
 Happy Man
 B.B.
 
 
 Love

References

External links
 

1959 births
Living people
Manga artists from Kanagawa Prefecture